Parmi may refer to:

 Parmigiana, an Italian dish
 Chicken parmigiana, an Italian-American or Italian-Australian rendition of the above
 Pāramī, or paramita, a concept in Buddhism
 the variety of the Hindko language spoken in the Neelam Valley in Pakistan-administered Kashmir